Ajusco is a  lava dome volcano located just south of Mexico City, Mexico, in the Tlalpan borough of the city. It is the highest point in the city.

Etymology
Ajusco is a Náhuatl word variously translated as "source of waters" or "watered grove", and the Lerma River and Balsas River draw some of their source waters from this area.  Also, the flow from all of the remaining strong springs in the area adjacent to the peak are captured to augment Mexico City's water supply.

Geology
Ajusco is a lava dome complex of Pliocene-Pleistocene age, surrounded by block and ash flow deposits. Ajusco is part of the mountain chain of volcanic origin known as Sierra de Ajusco-Chichinauhtzin, among which Xitle, Tláloc, Pelado, Cuautzin and Chichinautzin stand out.  This range is part of the Trans-Mexican Volcanic Belt which crosses central Mexico and contains the country's highest peaks.

Ecology
Parts of this range account for about half of the area of the Mexican Federal District, the rest of which is occupied by Mexico City.
The area is important for conservation of local ecosystems.  In its oak, pine and fir forests there are unique endemic species like the teporingo rabbit and the volcano mouse.

Sites of interest

The area around the peak is a popular destination for residents of Mexico City and tourists, with activities such mountain biking, horseback riding, motorcycling, hiking and climbing. The area is one of the few around Mexico City where it may snow in the winter. This mountain offers views over the Valley of Mexico (weather and pollution permitting), including the city and its skyscrapers, Popocatepetl, Iztaccihuatl and Nevado de Toluca volcanoes, and parts of the Valley of Cuernavaca.

The Ajusco area is also home to Six Flags México (the largest amusement park in Latin America), the TV Azteca television network, the National Pedagogic University, the UNAM radio transmission center, the Fondo de Cultura Económica and El Colegio de México.

Atop the volcano is a pre-Hispanic site where artifacts have been discovered.

References

External links

Chichinautzin volcano

Geography of Mesoamerica
Mountains of Mexico
Volcanoes of Mexico City
Landforms of Mexico City
Pliocene lava domes
Pleistocene lava domes